The 2015 F2000 Championship Series season is the tenth season of competition for the series.

21 year-old American Sam Beasley won all but two races of the fourteen round championship, dominating his way to the title. Second place Eric Filgueras was held winless and finished well back in the Championship. Canadian Steve Bamford won the Masters Championship for drivers over 40 years old and finished third overall in points with one win.

Race calendar and results

Final standings

References

External links
 Official Series Website

F2000 Championship Series
F2000 Championship Series seasons